Houston railway station was a railway station serving the villages of Brookfield and Houston, Renfrewshire, Scotland, originally as part of the Bridge of Weir Railway and later part of the Glasgow and South Western Railway.

History 
The station opened on 3 April 1871 and was known as Windyhill. It was soon renamed Crosslee in May of the same year, and then renamed Houston on 1 January 1874. It was renamed Houston (Crosslee) exactly one year later on 1 January 1875, and then later renamed Houston and Crosslee.

Closure 
It was finally renamed back to Houston on 7 May 1973, however the station closed on 10 January 1983.

A single platform remains on site, the station building which had been private residence was demolished in 2021.

References

Notes

Sources 
 
 
 

Disused railway stations in Renfrewshire
Railway stations in Great Britain opened in 1871
Railway stations in Great Britain closed in 1983
Former Glasgow and South Western Railway stations